Munger is an unincorporated community in Solway Township, Saint Louis County, Minnesota, United States.

The community is located 11 miles west of the city of Duluth at the junction of U.S. Highway 2 and County Road 223 (Munger Shaw Road). Munger is located seven miles west of the city of Proctor.

History
A post office called Munger was established in 1903, and remained in operation until 1931. The community was named for Roger S. Munger, a businessperson in the mining industry.

Community
The unincorporated community of Munger is located within Solway Township (population 1,944).

Most of Munger is located in Saint Louis County, however the mailing address for most of Munger is Cloquet, which is in adjacent Carlton County.

Local business establishments include the Munger Tavern and Grill.

Munger also includes a handful of churches, including Hope Lutheran Church (LCMS).

Nearby places
The Willard Munger Trail
Spirit Mountain Ski Recreation Area

Nearby cities and communities
Duluth
Hermantown
Proctor
Simar
Saginaw
Twig
Esko

References

Unincorporated communities in Minnesota
Unincorporated communities in St. Louis County, Minnesota